Below are lists of political parties espousing Pan-Arabist and Arab Nationalist ideologies in various approaches. Arab nationalism or Arabism in its contemporary concept refers to the belief that the Arab people are one people united by language, culture, history, geography and interests, and that a single Arab state will be established to unite the Arabs within the borders drawn by colonial powers.

Ruling as Majority

Minor Representation in Lower-House

Formerly ruling as Majority

No representation in Lower-House

Nasserist 
 – Dignity Party (Egypt), Egyptian Popular Current

 – Arab European League

 – Arab Struggle Party, Nasserist Socialist Vanguard Party,

 – Al-Mourabitoun, Nasserist Unionists Movement, Union of Working People's Forces, Toilers League, Lebanese Arab Movement

 – Arab Palestine Organization, Action Organization for the Liberation of Palestine

 – Democratic Arab Socialist Union

 – Democratic Nasserist Party, Nasserist Reform Organization

Arab Nationalism 
 – National Justice Movement, Progressive Democratic Tribune

 – Arab Unification Party, Arab Party for Justice and Equality, Arab Unification Party, Egyptian Arab Union Party, Free Republican Party, National Conciliation Party, United Nasserist Party, Arabic Popular Movement, Arabism Egypt Party

 – Islamic Reconciliation Party

 – Arab Democratic Party, Arab National Party

 – Jordanian Arab Party

 – Kuwait Democratic Forum

 – Arab Democratic Party, Democratic Left Movement, Najjadeh Party, People's Movement, Lebanese Arab Struggle Movement, Arab Unification Party

 – Palestinian Arab Front, Palestinian Liberation Front

 – Popular Unity Party, Unionist Democratic Union

Arab Socialism 
 – National Democratic Action Society, Popular Front for the Liberation of Bahrain, Popular Front for the Liberation of the Occupied Arabian Gulf

 – Egyptian Arab Socialist Party

 – Arab Revolutionary Workers Party

 – Da'am Workers Party

 – Jordanian Democratic Popular Unity Party

 – Arab Socialist Action Party, Lebanese Social Democratic Party, Progressive Arab Front, Socialist Lebanon, Communist Action Organization in Lebanon, Arab Socialist Union

 – Islamic Socialist Party

 – Social Democratic Unionists

 – Democratic Patriots' Unified Party, Workers' Party

Ba'athism 
 – Arab Socialist Ba'ath Party of Algeria

 – Nationalist Democratic Assembly

 – Arab Socialist Ba'ath, Al-Awda

 – Arab Ba'ath Progressive Party, Jordanian Arab Socialist Ba'ath Party

 – Arab Socialist Ba'ath Party – Kuwait Region

 – Socialist Arab Lebanon Vanguard Party

 – Libyan Arab Socialist Ba'ath Party

 – National Vanguard Party

 – Arab Liberation Front, As-Sa'iqa

 – Arab Socialist Ba'ath Party, Arab Socialist Ba'ath Party, Sudanese Ba'ath Party

 – Sahrawi Socialist Baath Party

 – Democratic Socialist Arab Ba'ath Party, Arab Socialist Ba'ath

 – Party of the Democratic Arab Vanguard

 – Arab Socialist Ba'ath Party, National Arab Socialist Ba'ath Party

Defunct or Banned

Nasserist 
 – Nasserist People's Congress Party, Senior Nasserist Conference

 – Progressive Arab Front, Union of Working People's Forces-Corrective Movement, United Nasserite Organization

 – Arab Socialist Union (Libya)

 – Arabian Peninsula People's Union

Arab Nationalism 
 – Syrian Unity Party

 – Andalusian Liberation

 – Al-Muthanna Club, Arab Unity Party, Party of National Brotherhood, Reconciliation and Liberation Bloc

 – Agriculture and Development, Arab List for Bedouin and Villagers, Cooperation and Brotherhood

 – Arab People's Movement, National Bloc, Palestine Arab Party, Reform Party

 Ottoman Empire – Al-ʽAhd (Iraq), Al-Fatat

 – Arab National Party, League of Nationalist Action, National Party

 – Destour

 – Free Yemeni Movement, National Liberation Front

Arab Socialism 
 – Young Egypt Party

 – Arab Struggle Party, Arabic Toilers' Movement

 – Jordanian Revolutionary People's Party, National Socialist Party

 – Organization of Lebanese Socialists

 – Mauritanian National Renaissance Party

 – Dhofar Liberation Front, Popular Front for the Liberation of Oman

 – Youth Congress Party, Palestine Popular Liberation Organization

 – Arab Socialist Action Party

 – Revolutionary Democratic Party

 – Umma Party

Ba'athism 
 – National Democratic Front for the Liberation of Oman and the Arabian Gulf

 – People's Vanguard Party

References 

 
Arab nationalist